Rodney Mann (30 September 1929 – 8 January 2005) was a British bobsledder. He competed in the four-man event at the 1956 Winter Olympics.

References

1929 births
2005 deaths
British male bobsledders
Olympic bobsledders of Great Britain
Bobsledders at the 1956 Winter Olympics
Place of birth missing